Shirley Geraldine Edwina Carr  (May 1929 – June 24, 2010) was a Canadian union leader who was the first woman president of Canada's largest labour organization, the Canadian Labour Congress.

Union activism 
Carr first became active in the labour movement in 1960, when she was employed by the City of Niagara Falls and a member of CUPE Local 133, then in 1970, she became an employee of the Regional Municipality of Niagara and the founding President of CUPE Local 1287. She became general vice-president of the Canadian Union of Public Employees in 1969, and also served as president of CUPE's Ontario Division between 1972 and 1974. Between 1974 and 1984, she held the position of executive vice-president of the Canadian Labour Congress. In 1984, she became secretary-treasurer of the CLC, and in 1986 was elected its president.

CLC presidency 
As president of the CLC, she began Canadian labour's campaign against the Canada-US Free Trade Agreement, a deal promoted by then-prime minister Brian Mulroney and the late US president Ronald Reagan and signed in 1988. She was a pioneer in using the technique of seeking support for labour's goals from other organizations in the community, and this strategy was ultimately responsible for turning the tide of public opinion against the trade deal.

Chairperson of the Workers' Group in the International Labour Organisation  
Shirley Carr was elected in 1991 to be the first female chairperson of the Workers' Group in the ILO, and as such vice president of the Governing Body of the ILO. She served in this position until 1993.

Honours and positions 
As the first female president of Canada's largest labour federation, Carr was awarded numerous honours. She was made an Officer of the Order of Canada in 1980 and a Member of the Order of Ontario in 1995. She received the Centennial Medal for Exemplary Contribution to Vocational/Technical Education in 1980, the Commemorative Medal for the 125th Anniversary of Canadian Federation in 1992, and the Governor General's Award in Commemoration of the Persons Case in 1994. She was also awarded honorary doctorates from Acadia University, Brock University, McMaster University, University of Northern British Columbia, University of Western Ontario, University of Victoria, and York University.

References

External links

 Shirley Carr at The Canadian Encyclopedia
 Canadian Labour Congress website 
 Georgetti praises Shirley Carr

1929 births
2010 deaths
Presidents of the Canadian Labour Congress
Trade unionists from Ontario
Members of the Order of Ontario
Officers of the Order of Canada
People from Niagara Falls, Ontario
Canadian Union of Public Employees people
Canadian women trade unionists

Governor General's Award in Commemoration of the Persons Case winners